Macaria promiscuata, the promiscuous angle, is a species of geometrid moth in the family Geometridae.

The MONA or Hodges number for Macaria promiscuata is 6331.

References

Further reading

External links

 

Macariini
Articles created by Qbugbot
Moths described in 1974